Taikury is a village in Rivne Raion, Rivne Oblast, Ukraine. As of the year 2001, the community had 619 residents.

History 
The first mention about a village Taikury is dated 1570 by a year. In 1583 a village belonged to I. Shpanovsky, and after wedding of Theodora Shpanovska with Yuri Wyshnewetsky stepped back to the influential princely family of Wyshnewetsky. From 1614 a village got a Magdeburg Law. After a receipt by the small town of Magdeburg Law his population increased notedly, handicraft life came alive. At the beginning of the 18th century Taikury passed to the family of Peplovsky.

The village is mentioned in Kresowa księga sprawiedliwych on page 107.

Architectural sights 
 Castle (ruins), 16th-17th century
 Church of St. Lawrence, 1710 (Baroque)
 Church of the Intercession, 1730

References

External links 
 Terletsky J. Holy Jury — a symbol of the village Taykury / J. Terletsky // Rivne evening. — 2000. — № 12 (3 February). — P. 3 
 Castles and churches of Ukraine 
 Weather in the Horodok 

Villages in Rivne Raion
Populated places established in 1570